Quatre? is a French comic book by Enki Bilal, and the fourth album of the tetralogy featuring Nike Hatzfeld.

External links
 Bilal publications in English on Humanoids Publishing

French comics
Comics by Enki Bilal